The Eyemouth disaster was a severe European windstorm that struck the south-eastern coast of Scotland on 14 October 1881. One hundred and eighty-nine fishermen, most of whom were from Eyemouth, were drowned. Many citizens of Eyemouth call the day Black Friday.

Disaster

Following a period of poor weather, the morning of 14 October was calm.  Though the storm was predicted (as the barometric pressure was very low), the fishing fleets put to sea through economic necessity.

Many of the fishing boats were either capsized, or wrecked against the coastline.

Casualties

Eyemouth - 129
Burnmouth - 24
Newhaven - 17
Cove - 11
Fisherrow - 7
Coldingham Shore - 3
Some boats that had not capsized were wrecked on the Hurkar Rocks. Many houses were also destroyed. Two days later, the Ariel Gazelle turned up in Eyemouth, having braved the storm instead of fleeing.

Aftermath

A donation-led relief fund was established to provide financial security to families who had lost members to the storm. The response was significant, bringing in over £50,000 (£ in 2015).

The disaster was the subject of a contemporary oil on canvas painting by Scottish artist J. Michael Brown

See also
Moray Firth fishing disaster

Notes

References
Peter Aitchison. Children of the Sea: The Story of the People of Eyemouth. Tuckwell Press Ltd, 2001.

Further reading
 "Black Friday" by Peter Aitchison {Birlinn Press, 2006}
 "The Boy Who Came Ashore" by Alan Gay (Dreadful Night Press, 2006)

External links
The Eyemouth Disaster - Black Friday
The Eyemouth Disaster of 1881
  Listing of Individuals who Perished
When the seas swallowed Scotland's fishermen
The 1881 disaster memorials

Fishing in Scotland
Natural disasters in Scotland
1881 natural disasters
1881 in Scotland
European windstorms
Fishing disasters
Maritime incidents in 1881
October 1881 events
Eyemouth
1881 disasters in the United Kingdom